Aleksandersen is a Norwegian patronymic surname, literally meaning "son of Aleksander". It may refer to:

Åge Aleksandersen (born 1949), Norwegian singer, songwriter and guitarist
Frank Aleksandersen (born 1953), Norwegian singer and drummer
Oddny Aleksandersen (born 1942), Norwegian politician

Norwegian-language surnames
Patronymic surnames
Surnames from given names